Murder in Eden may refer to:

 Murder in Eden (TV Series), a 1991 British television miniseries
 Murder in Eden (film), a 1961 British film